Saint George church orthodox parish church (PCU) in Shmankivchyky of the Zavodske settlement hromada of the Chortkiv Raion of the Ternopil Oblast.

History 
Shmankivchyky has long belonged to the parish of neighboring Shmankivtsi. But in the village there was a chapel (1872), under which the former lords were buried. The chapel was run by a lord, but Ukrainian Greek Catholics had the right to use it.

In 1989, on the feast of Dmitry, the cornerstone was consecrated for the construction of the church, which began to be built by the whole village community. But over time, the community split into Orthodox and Greek Catholics. The Orthodox community became the user of the newly built church, and Greek Catholics were forced to attend services in the churches of neighboring villages.

The Church of the Holy Great Martyr George the Victorious was built from the autumn of 1989 to 1993 and consecrated on August 11, 1996. The painting was completed in 1998-1999. Bishop Pavlo of Ternopil and Terebovlya visited the church and conducted the service.

On June 8, 2009, widow Stefania Lesyk, 63, collected holy water near the church. In three days I looked - and a white porcelain jug covered with a clear liquid with a red tinge. Abbot Fr. Volodymyr Svarychensky announced a miracle in the church and began worshiping over it.

On December 15, 2018, the church and the parish moved to the PCU.

Volodymyr Sadlyak is the chairman of the church committee. Ivan Semenyuk and Daniil Kuz were active in the church fraternity. The community has more than 600 members.

On the territory of the church there is a sculpture of St. Caetano, which was previously located on the territory of the church; made of stone in 1876. It is currently located in the village cemetery.

References

Sources 
 с. Шманьківчики. Храм св. вмч. Юрія Переможця // Храми Української Православної Церкви Київського патріархату. Тернопільщина / Автор концепції Куневич Б.; головний редактор Буяк Я.; фото: Снітовський О., Крочак І., Кислинський Е., Бурдяк В. — Тернопіль : ТОВ «Новий колір», 2012. — С. 384. : іл. — ISBN 978-966-2061-24-6.

Churches in Ukraine